The Colonial School District covers the Borough of Conshohocken and Plymouth Township and Whitemarsh Township in Montgomery County, Pennsylvania. The district operates Plymouth Whitemarsh High School (9th-12th), Central Montco Technical High School (9th-12th), Colonial Middle School (6th-8th), Colonial Elementary School (4th-5th), Conshohocken Elementary School (K-3rd), Plymouth Elementary School (K-3rd), Ridge Park Elementary School (K-3rd) and Whitemarsh Elementary School (K-3rd).

References

School districts in Montgomery County, Pennsylvania